Caius Tacitus Ryland (June 30, 1826—December 5, 1897) was a Democratic politician who served in the California State Assembly from the 4th and later from the 7th district, serving as Speaker of the Assembly between 1867 and 1868.

Life

Early life and career 
Ryland was born in Howard County, Missouri in 1826, the son of John Ferguson Ryland, a future justice on the Missouri Supreme Court, and was one of 18 children. In his youth, he attended school in Lexington, worked on a farm, and studied law, eventually being accepted to the Missouri bar. Ryland was drawn to California in 1849, during the Gold Rush, and was appointed clerk of the Court of First Instance in San Francisco by Military Governor Bennet C. Riley shortly after his arrival. Upon the election of Peter Hardeman Burnett as the first Governor of California, Ryland became his private secretary and then practiced law in San Jose after the governor's resignation. Ryland would later marry Burnett's daughter, Martha, thus making Burnett his father-in-law. Ryland promoted the construction of a wagon trail across the Sierra Madre mountains and the first railroad to be built in the state from San Francisco to San Jose, and was a director and attorney for that railroad until it was sold to the Central Pacific Railroad.

California State Assembly 

Ryland was elected to the California State Assembly from the 4th district in 1855, and chaired the Committee on Internal Improvements where he reported a bill on building a wagon road across the Sierra Nevada Mountains. He was re-elected in 1867 from the 7th district and served as Speaker of the Assembly, serving in the office until 1868. He left the Assembly in 1869.

Later career 

In 1876, Ryland was chairman of the Democratic State Convention and tried an unsuccessful run for U.S. Senate. He practiced law in San Jose until his death in 1897.

References 

1826 births
1897 deaths
Speakers of the California State Assembly